DonChristian Jones, also known as DonChristian is a New York-based rapper, producer and visual artist. His work spans musical and visual performances, rap, installations and public murals blending both genres of painting and hip-hop and referencing classical and contemporary styles. Jones is a co-founder of Public Assistants, a Resistance Community Space focused on mutual aid, in Crown Heights, Brooklyn.

Early life 
Born in Philadelphia, DonChristian attended a Pennsylvania George School in his teens. His father is also a musician and his uncle is the late soul singer Teddy Pendergrass. He graduated from Wesleyan University in 2012, where he studied painting. After graduating from college, he moved to New York, where he is now based.

Work 
While at Wesleyan University he was president of The Eclectic Society (fraternity). He is a member of  the Camp & Street collective having collaborated on projects alongside members like Boody, Rahel and Le1f. In 2013 DonChristian released his first mixtape, The Wayfarer  on Camp & Street and Himanshu Suri's Greedhead Music label. In August 2014, Vogue.com exclusively released the single "Green Dream" produced by Suicideyear. Later that year, he released his second mixtape Renzo Piano, inspired by the Italian architect after whom the tape is named. The Quietus named his 2014 mixtape Renzo Piano one of the best albums of the year. In 2015 DonChristian presented Camp & Street at the New Whitney Block Party, with acts including Le1f, Junglepussy, and House of Ladosha. He later performed at the 2015 Whitney Museum of American Art Annual Art Party. In 2016 DonChristian performed original works as part of Eiko Otake series A Body in Places at the St. Mark's Church in-the-Bowery. DonChristian's debut album, Where There's Smoke, was released in July 2018.

His influence range from artists such as Eric Fischl, Eiko & Koma, and musical acts Outkast and Three 6 Mafia.

Discography

Albums 
 Where There's Smoke (2018)
 Don (2021)

Mixtapes
 The Wayfarer (2013)
 Renzo Piano (2014)

Music videos

References

External links
Official Website
DonChristian's Soundcloud

Rappers from Philadelphia
1989 births
Living people
21st-century American rappers